USCGC Midgett has been the name of more than one United States Coast Guard ship, and may refer to:

 , launched in 1971 and decommissioned in 2020
 , launched in 2017

United States Coast Guard ship names